Monteu da Po is a small comune in the Metropolitan City of Turin, Piedmont, Italy, 32 km north-east of Turin.

History
Monteu da Po  was an ancient settlement of the Ligures. Its pre-Roman name, which appears on 
inscriptions of the early imperial period, was Bodincomagus from the Ligurian name of the Po, Bodincus, which meant "bottomless". It stood on the right bank of the river, which has since changed its course and runs now a kilometre to the north of the town.

In Roman times this became the flourishing colonia Industria  of the Augustan Regio IX, enrolled in the tribus Pollia. Its importance derived from its location on the road which followed the Po from Augusta Taurinorum to Vardagate.

Excavations have brought to light a tower, a cult building (previously identified as a theatre), a sanctuary of Isis, valuable bronze figures (some of them made locally) and numerous inscriptions.

Industria appears to have been deserted in the fourth century CE.

The name "Monteu" came from Latin mons acutus, meaning "sharp mountain".

References

Sources

External links
“INDU´STRIA'” in William Smith, Ed. (1854), Dictionary of Greek and Roman Geography.
Industria at the Perseus Digital Library.
Page at comuni italiani website

Cities and towns in Piedmont